Harry C. Lee (January 27, 1932 – March 24, 2019) was a Canadian football player who played for the Hamilton Tiger-Cats. He played college football at the University of Alabama. After his football career was ended by a shoulder injury, he was a financial adviser for Equitable Life Insurance Company in Tuscaloosa.\

References

1932 births
People from Leeds, Alabama
Hamilton Tiger-Cats players
Living people
University of Alabama alumni